Callopistria deflexusa is a moth of the family Noctuidae. It is found in Taiwan.

References

Moths described in 1991
Caradrinini
Moths of Taiwan